Nepryaev is a Russian masculine surname, its feminine counterpart is Nepryaeva. Notable people with the surname include:

Ivan Nepryaev (born 1982), Russian ice hockey forward
Natalya Nepryayeva (born 1995), Russian cross-country skier

Russian-language surnames